Gora-Podol is a rural locality (a selo) and the administrative center of Gora-Podolskoye Rural Settlement, Grayvoronsky District, Belgorod Oblast, Russia. The population was 1,862 as of 2010. There are 28 streets.

Geography 
Gora-Podol is located 2 km southwest of Grayvoron (the district's administrative centre) by road. Grayvoron is the nearest rural locality.

References 

Rural localities in Grayvoronsky District
Grayvoronsky Uyezd